Dheeraj Gopichand Hinduja (born August 1971) is a British-Indian businessman, the chairman of Ashok Leyland since October 2010.

Early life
Dheeraj Hinduja was born in Iran in August 1971, the son of Gopichand Hinduja. The Hinduja family is of Sindhi heritage.

He received a bachelor's degree from University College London in 1993, and an MBA from Imperial College London in 1994.

Personal life
He married Shalini Chandiramani, a fellow student at Imperial College, and the daughter of a Morocco-based film distributor, some time before 1996. As of 2005, they had two children, Vedika and Vedant.

References

1971 births
Dheeraj
British people of Indian descent
Businesspeople from Mumbai
Living people
British people of Sindhi descent